Punctonora is a genus of lichen-forming fungi in the  family Lecanoraceae. The genus was circumscribed in 1997 by lichenologist André Aptroot, with Punctonora nigropulvinata assigned as the type species. A second species was added to the genus in 2018.

References

Lecanoraceae
Lichen genera
Lecanorales genera
Taxa named by André Aptroot
Taxa described in 1997